Sanosra is a village and former princely state on Saurashtra peninsula, in Gujarat state, western India.

History
Sanosra was a Sixth Class princely state of Jhalawar prant, which during the British raj was handled by the colonial Eastern Kathiawar Agency. 

It also comprised two other villages and was ruled by a Kathi Chieftain. It had a combined population in 1901 of 667, yielding a state revenue of 4,4965 Rupees (1903-4, mostly from land), paying a tribute of 237 Rupees, to the British, Junagadh State and Sukhdi State.

External links
 Imperial Gazetteer on DSAL - Kathiawar

Princely states of Gujarat
Kathi princely states